The Central Library of Astan Quds Razavi is a large library in Mashad, Iran. Established before 1457, it holds over 1.1 million volumes. It is an international center for Islamic research, containing numerous manuscripts and rare works of antiquity of Islamic history.

The library has 35 branches:

 17 libraries in Mashhad, Iran.
  5 libraries in Khorasan province.
 12 libraries in other cities of Iran.
  1 library in India.

History
The Organization of Libraries, Museums, and the Documentation Centre of Astan Quds Razavi is considered as one of the most important treasures of the recorded knowledge of Iran and the world of Islam.

There is no information about the exact date of the establishment of the library of Asta- Quds - Razvi. Some consider the endowment date (974 AD) of the oldest Quran to the Holy Shrine of Imam Reza (AS) by a person called Ali Ibn Simjour, as the year of establishment date of the library of Asta- Quds - Razvi (or recitation place of Quran). It can also be assumed from some extant documents concerning the endowments that the library was open to the public and used by them in 1457 AD. From about 1737 AD, a special place was allocated to the library but a serious attention was paid to it in the early period of 20th century. However, an increasing inclination of using the library by the researches and scholars, prompted a faster development and growth to the library.

Although the location of the library has been changed many times over years, it has always been remained in the vicinity of the Holy Shrine.

Features

The construction of the present building was completed in 1995, with a constructed area of 28,800 square meters and was opened to the public in April 1995. Some of the outstanding features of the complex are as follows:

 Affiliation of the complex to the shrine of Imam Reza
 Many manuscripts of very long life, artifacts and museum objects, dating back 1000 years.
 Exquisite copies of Qur'an, manuscripts, and printed books.
 A vast collection of printed books in different fields.
 sophisticated facilities and technologies.
 A rich collection of documents and serials.

The number of manuscripts held by the library in 2003 was 30,250 volumes, 25,000 of earlier lithographic books, 17,240 other handwritten materials; 72,490  volumes in total.

The Bureau of Museums of Astan Quds
Affiliated with the library are eleven different museums which are located in different buildings near each other. They collectively form the Astan Quds Razavi Central Museum:

The Museum of Qur'an and Precious Objects
The Museum of precious objects donated by the Supreme Leader of the Islamic Republic of Iran
The specialized Museum of Carpets
The Museum of Armaments
The Museum of Astronomical Tools and Clocks
The Museum of Coins and Medals
The Museum of the History of Mashhad
The Museum of pottery and glassware
The Museum of fine arts
The Museum of Stamps and Banknotes
The Museum of Shellfishes and Mollusks

The bureau of museums maintains an office for the preservation and repair of historical objects of the Museum and library by a technical staff of specialists.

See also
Mashhad
Ayatollah al-Shirazi, one of the benefactors of the library.
National Library of Iran
MS 5229
Ahmad ibn Fadlan

References

External links
 
Online Library

Government of Iran
Cultural organisations based in Iran
Libraries in Iran
Iran
Buildings and structures in Mashhad
Education in Razavi Khorasan Province